Mandagere Subbarao Krishnamurthy (born 16 June 1931), known by the pen name Indiresh or Ma Su Krishnamurthy, is a Kannada writer and Hindi writer.

He was conferred the Tamra Patra award by former President of India, Shankar Dayal Sharma in recognition of his literary work in Hindi.

Biography

Early life and education 

Krishnamurthy was born in Mandagere, of Mandya district in Karnataka State to a native Kannada family.  His education began in Mandagere.  He moved to Mysore for further studies and completed his Master of Arts (M.A.) in Kannada from Mysore University in 1958. He continued his studies in Banaras Hindu University and earned his M.A. in Hindi in 1962.   He then moved to Mysore to pursue further studies and earned his PhD in Hindi from Mysore University in 1966.  He currently lives in Mysore with his wife Indira Krishnamurthy.

Career 

Krishnamurthy began his academic career as a lecturer in Hindi at National College, Bangalore in 1967. He then moved to Mysore University and joined the Hindi Department.  He served as a professor of Hindi and retired as the Head of the Hindi Department in the year 1991.  He also served as the Hindi Advisory board member in the Health and Family Welfare Ministry in the Indian Government from 1988 to 1991.

Awards 

 Tamra Patra, Awarded by the Government of India for literary work in Hindi
 Dakshina Kesari Sahitya Award for his literary work in Kannada – 2010
 Basavaraju Award for his literary work in Kannada – 2008
 Kuvempu Award, Karnataka Sangha, Shimoga – 2010
 Honored by the Kendriya Hindi Directorate 3 years in a row
 Babu Gangasharan Award, Kendriya Hindi Sansthan, Agra – 1996
 Ananda Rushi Award, Hyderabad – 1992
 Hindi Prathistan Award, Hyderabad – 1990
 Mahatma Gandhi Award, Bangalore University, Bangalore – 1990
 Reserve Bank of India Award – 2000
 Karnataka Rajya Sarkar Award
 Souhardha Sanman from Uttar Pradesh Government – 1999
 Rashtra Dharma Seva Sanman, Lucknow – 2008
 Karnataka Rajya Sahitya Academy Award two years in a row
 Nrupatunga Award – 2001
 Swarna Jayanthi Award, Mysore University – 1998
 Karnataka Vidya Vardhaka Sangha Award, Dharwad – 1998
 T. N. Sri. Award, Mysore University – 1980
 Hindi novel 'Aparajita' won the First place in the Central Hindi Directorate – 1973
 Hindi novel 'Raga Kanada' won the Mahatma Gandhi prize from the Bangalore University
 Hindi novel 'Parashuram Ki Behene' won the Central Hindi Directorate award – 1983
 Hindi novel 'Jyoti Kalash' won the Central Hindi Directorate award – 1988
 Honored by Government of Karnataka for all the literary work in Kannada

Bibliography

Literary works 

 'Aranyak' original Hindi story collection (1994)
 'Kavishree Kuvempu Kavishree Mala'  (1962)
 'Comparative study of the main trends in Hindi and Kannada literature' 
 'Samaradhana' a collection of research papers (1981)
 'Kannada Sahitya Vahini' (Brief history of Kannada literature) – (1978)
 'Sahitya Sandipani' (1978)
 'Sahitya Sthaban' (1982)

Hindi to Kannada translations 

 'Banabhatta ki atmakatha' (Life story of Banabhatta) – (1956)
 'Mrugayana' 
 'Jaya Somanath' (1962)
 'Suraj ki Sathvaghada' (1970)
 'Chidambara Sanehayan' (1974)
 'Meghadhuth Ek Puranu Kahani' (1974)
 'Anamadas Ka Potha' (1980)
 'Komal Gandhar' (1985)
 'Ramacharitha Manasa' (1990)
 'Vinaya Pathika' (1999)
 'Kabir Padavali' (2000)
 'Bihari Sapthapadi' (1994)
 'Meera Padavali' (2004)
 'Sura Padavali' (2005)

Original works in Kannada 

 'Hindi Sahitya' (1976)
 'Siddha Sahitya' (1981)
 'Sufi Premakavya' (1991) 
 'Utharada Santha Parampare' (2003)
 'Sufi Prema Darshan' (1998)
 'Bihari' (1995)
 'Surdas' (1973)
 'Vidyapathi' (1983)

Original novels in Kannada 

 'Nadasethu' (1970) 
 'Khagayana' (1976) 
 'Hadagina Hakki' (1980) 
 'Parashuramana Thangiyaru' (1998) 
 'Kuri Sakida Thola' (1999) 
 'Kasturi Mruga' (2000) 
 'Chaturmuka' (2001) 
 'RathaChakra' (2004) 
 'Onti Salaga' (2003)
 'Phalguni' (2004)

Collection of stories 

 'Bettakke Chaliyadare' (2002) 
 'Punargamana' (2002)

Collection of essays 

 'Gandhamadana' (1973) 
 'Chankramana' (1978)
 'Chaitraratha' (1986)
 'Hadipurana' (1981)
 'Ekantha Sangeetha' (1999)
 'Kirthirag' (1998)
 'Girikarnika' (2000)
 'Deepamale' (2004)

Sketches 

 'Chitta Bittiya Chitragalu' (1998)
 'Gopurada Deepa' (1995)
 'Santha Narasi Mahta' (2002)
 'Vyomakeshana Vachanagalu' (2000)
 'Samudra Sangama' (2001)

Dramas 

 'Yuganta'
 'Ratna Kankana' (2003)

Criticism 

 'Seemollangana' (2000)
 'Sethu Bandhana' (2001)
 'Parishodhana' (2002)

Children's novels 

 'Meera Bai' (1973)
 'Santha Rai Das' (1988)
 'Maharshi Karve'
 'Kitturu Rani Chennamma'
 'Kogileya Chikkavva'
 'Chandamamana Aliya'
 'Menasina Kayiya Sahasa'
 'Kaluvgala Jagala'
 'Gora Badal'
 'Chitra Pallava'

Poems 

 'Anantha Yatre' (2006)

Edited 

 'Nalachampa' (1971)

External links

References 

1931 births
Writers from Mysore
Kannada-language writers
Hindi-language writers
Kannada people
University of Mysore alumni
Banaras Hindu University alumni
Living people